Bournville railway station serves the Bournville area of Birmingham, England. It is on the Cross-City Line which runs from Redditch to Lichfield via Birmingham New Street.

History
The station opened on 3 April 1876 as the temporary southern terminus of the Birmingham West Suburban Railway, while the difficult construction of the junction with the Birmingham and Gloucester Railway was completed at Kings Norton. Stirchley Street opened as a single platform with later added run around loop. In an initial land rental agreement with the Worcester and Birmingham Canal, the station sits above Bournville Lane, as the tracks are on an embankment, shared with the canal. 

With the opening of the Cadbury Bournville Factory in 1879, in 1880 the station was renamed Stirchley Street and Bournville. After an improved through connection was developed to the Birmingham and Gloucester at Kings Norton in 1885, the railway track to Birmingham was doubled along its lines entire length as the line was extended into Birmingham New Street. This necessitated the construction of a southbound platform between the line and the canal, resulting even today in a narrow platform. In 1904, the station was finally renamed Bournville.

The station area has changed considerably since the Midland Railway days and lost virtually all its original features as the station was completely rebuilt by British Rail in 1978 to the designs of the architect John Broome along with the others on this line when the Cross-City route was commissioned. Prior to the rebuild, the station had only received a limited service (mainly at peak hours) for much of the 1960s and 1970s. The line was electrified in 1993.

Station masters

H.G. Clayfield 1876 - 1880
H. Shaw 1880 - 1881 
Frederick Watkin 1881 - 1883 (formerly station master at Somerset Road, afterwards station master at Whatstandwell)
W.H. Turner 1883 - 1888  (formerly station master at Cray, afterwards station master at Edwalton)
J. Jones 1888 (formerly station master at Cray)
Albert Christopher East 1889 - 1891 (afterwards station master at Freeton)
Arthur James Dewey 1891 - 1929 
H.J. Parker 1930 - 1937
S. Davies ca. 1940
William Blackmore 1946 - 1956

Today
The Cadbury chocolate factory is still adjacent to the station, reflected in the fact that Bournville station is partly painted in Cadbury purple, and station signs include the famous Cadbury logo, a reflection of the station providing ideal access for Cadbury World.

The station currently only serves trains of the Cross City Line, all services currently being operated by Class 323 electrical multiple units. Services are all operated by West Midlands Trains on behalf of Transport for West Midlands.

Bournville Station is equipped with real-time information departure boards which were installed in 2006 by Central Trains.

In 2010, the station featured in episode 18 of Michael Portillo's television series Great British Railway Journeys.

In 2011, the station featured in episode 2 of Julia Bradbury's television series Canal Walks with Julia Bradbury.

Disabled access
Both platforms have step-free access (by means of a ramp) from the Mary Vale Road entrance. The main station entrance, via the ticket office on Bournville Lane, only provides access to the platforms via steep steps. There is a ticket machine on platform 1 (for trains towards ) for the benefit of passengers who enter the station via the step-free entrance.

Services
There are four trains an hour that serve Bournville in each direction on Mondays to Saturdays, on Sunday there are 3 trains an hour, with two terminating northbound Lichfield Trent Valley and southbound at Redditch and one southbound at Bromsgrove and northbound at Birmingham New Street. On weekdays and Saturdays two of the northbound services terminate at Four Oaks whilst two continue onto Lichfield Trent Valley with two southbound services serving Redditch and the other two serving Bromsgrove.

References

External links

Rail Around Birmingham and the West Midlands: Bournville railway station
Warwickshire Railways page
Warwickshire Railways engine shed page

Railway stations in Birmingham, West Midlands
DfT Category D stations
Former Midland Railway stations
Railway stations in Great Britain opened in 1876
Railway stations served by West Midlands Trains
John Broome railway stations